Dilan 1990 is a 2018 Indonesian coming of age romantic drama film. It is based on the novel Dilan: Dia adalah Dilanku Tahun 1990 (Dilan: He is My Dilan in 1990) by Pidi Baiq. The film stars Iqbaal Ramadhan and Vanesha Prescilla as the main roles, with some high-profile names in supporting, minor, or cameo roles; Farhan, Happy Salma, Adhisty Zara of idol group JKT48, and Ridwan Kamil, the then-Mayor of Bandung. The film has been watched by 6.3 million people, and is the best-selling Indonesian film of 2018 and the second best-selling Indonesian film of all time, just behind Warkop DKI Reborn: Jangkrik Boss! Part 1 with 6.8 million viewers. The film is followed by a sequel, Dilan 1991, which was released on 28 February 2019.

Plot
In 1990, Milea, along with her parents and sister, move from Jakarta to Bandung. On her way to school, she meets Dilan, a guy known in school as the "bad boy" and leader of a motorbike gang. After a small talk, he convinces her that she will sit on his bike with him as her girlfriend one day. Dilan begins flirting by coming to her house, making payphone calls and sending her odd but romantic gifts which includes a pre-filled crossword puzzle book in which he said: "so you don’t have to think about the answers". Unbeknown to him, Milea already has a boyfriend named Benni back in Jakarta, however gradually, she no longer feels comfortable with him since he is rude and foul-mouthed. With Dilan's frequent overconfident advances, Milea starts to develop feelings for him.

During a school visit to the TVRI headquarters in Jakarta where Milea and other students are invited as quiz show contestants, Milea and Nandan, who are left alone by their friends, meet Benni, who aggressively beats Nandan, suspecting that Nandan will "steal" his girlfriend. When Benni calls Milea indecent. she angrily dumps Benni, and he calls Milea a whore. She rejects his later apology. Gradually, Dilan and Milea grow closer. They spend days going home together in Dilan's motorbike, holding hands, and phoning at night. They become so close, that Milea successfully persuades Dilan to stop being involved in gang fights for good. As she builds a good relationship with his mother, Milea learns that Dilan has been making poems out of love for her.

One day after school, Milea faces Kang Adi, both her and her sister's personal tutor, who apparently is in love with her. He eventually takes her to his university, the Bandung Institute of Technology, despite her refusal. When Dilan finds out that Milea went with Kang Adi, he writes a dismay-infused letter, much to her despair. The next day, she looks for him at school only to get into a fight with drunken Anhar, one of Dilan's gang member, who unwittingly slaps her. Knowing this, Dilan beats Anhar in anger. Later that day, Dilan and Milea officiate their relationship with a proclamation, thus becoming a couple.

Cast

Accolades

References

External links

2018 films
2018 romantic drama films
Films based on Indonesian novels
Indonesian romantic drama films
Indonesian high school films
Films directed by Fajar Bustomi
Films directed by Pidi Baiq